= Paul Ragsdale =

American politician

Member of the Texas House of Representatives from the 110th district
- In office January 11, 1983 – January 13, 1987
- Preceded by: District created
- Succeeded by: Fred Blair

Member of the Texas House of Representatives from district 33-N
- In office January 9, 1973 – January 11, 1983
- Preceded by: District created
- Succeeded by: District abolished

Personal details
- Born: January 14, 1945 Mount Haven, Texas
- Died: August 14, 2011 (aged 66) Tyler, Texas
- Party: Democratic

Paul Ragsdale (January 14, 1945 – August 14, 2011) was an American politician who served in the Texas House of Representatives from 1973 to 1987.

He died of a stroke on August 14, 2011, in Tyler, Texas at age 66.
